Çayırözü can refer to:

 Çayırözü, Bayburt
 Çayırözü, Gündoğmuş
 Çayırözü, İspir
 Çayırözü, Merzifon